The 1944 Bucknell Bison football team was an American football team that represented Bucknell University as an independent during the 1944 college football season. 

In its first season under head coach J. Ellwood Ludwig, the team compiled a 7–2–1 record. Gene Hubka and Ralph Grant were the team captains.

The team played its home games at Memorial Stadium in Lewisburg, Pennsylvania.

Schedule

References

Bucknell
Bucknell Bison football seasons
Bucknell Bison football